Suuremõisa is a village in Muhu Parish, Saare County in western Estonia.

References

Villages in Saare County